John Tucker was an English slave trader for the Royal African Company from London, England.

Slave trading
Tucker went to Gbap, Sierra Leone, in 1665 alongside Thomas Corker who was the ancestor of the Sherbro Caulkers, the most notorious slave trading family in the Upper Guinea Coast. John Tucker married a Sherbro princess and together they had many children. The Sherbro Tuckers became a powerful slave trading clan and chiefdom in Gbap and many of them went to university in Europe as early as the 18th century.

In 1694 John Tucker signed the commission for the 1694 voyage of the Amity captained by Thomas Tew.

Notes

References
 Culp, Daniel Wallace; Thomas D.S Tucker Twentieth Century Negro Literature: Or, A Cyclopedia of Thought on the Vital Topics Relating to ...
 Jones, Adam; History in Africa, Vol. 10, 1983 (1983), pp. 151–162
 Newcomb, Harveyp; A Cyclopedia of Missions: Containing a Comprehensive View of Missionary Operations Throughout
 Tucker, Peter L.; The Tuckers of Sierra Leone 1665-1914: a history of trade and British Colonisation of Sherbro Land

External links
 John Tucker
 John Tucker
  John Tucker
 John Tucker
 John Tucker
 John Tucker
 John Tucker
 John Tucker
 Google Books
 Manovision

Year of birth missing
Sherbro people
Year of death unknown
British slave traders
English merchants